Denise Roth (born 12 September 1988) is a German speed skater. She was born in Berlin. She competed at the 2014 World Sprint Championships in Nagano, and at the 2014 Winter Olympics in Sochi, in 500 meters.

References

External links 
 
 

1988 births
German female speed skaters
Speed skaters at the 2014 Winter Olympics
Olympic speed skaters of Germany
Speed skaters from Berlin
Living people
21st-century German women